Nakye Sanders (born July 6, 1998) is an American professional basketball player who last played for CD Povoa of Liga Portuguesa de Basquetebol. He played college basketball for the Duquesne Dukes and Towson Tigers.

High school career
Sanders attended Tottenville High School on Staten Island. He played four years of varsity basketball and led the team in scoring all four years. During his junior year, he caught the eyes of several NCAA Division I programs, getting offers from schools including Manhattan, Rhode Island and Drexel. Sanders also played AAU basketball for New Heights, with the likes of NBA player Ty Jerome. In 2014, Sanders made his commitment to Duquesne University in Pittsburgh, Pennsylvania.

College career
Sanders played two years at Duquesne University, where he came off the bench during his freshman season, then averaged 5.06 points per game in 21 starts during his sophomore year. 
 
Sanders transferred to Towson University in 2017 and had to sit out one year due to NCAA transfer eligibility rules. At Towson, Sanders started 50 of 62 games over two seasons.

Professional career

CD Povoa (2021-2022)
Sanders signed his first professional contract with CD Povoa of Liga Portuguesa de Basquetebol in September 2021. He averaged 15.5 points per game and 8.8 rebounds per game in his first professional season. He did not resign with CD Povoa for the following season.

Personal life
Sanders was born in Staten Island, New York to Corey Sanders and Maureen Lundy. On June 8, 2015, Sanders' father, Corey, was killed in a motorcycle accident. He cites his favorite athlete as Kobe Bryant.

References

External links
College statistics
Towson Tigers bio
Duquesne Dukes bio

1997 births
Living people
American men's basketball players
Basketball players from New York City
Forwards (basketball)
Duquesne Dukes men's basketball players
Towson Tigers men's basketball players
People from Staten Island
American expatriate basketball people in Portugal